Cardiospondylocarpofacial syndrome is a very rare genetic disorder which is characterized by cardiac, digital, osseous anomalies with facial dysmorphisms

Signs and symptoms 

The following is a list of the symptoms most commonly exhibited:

 Variable vertebral anomalies
 Brachydactyly
 Conductive hearing loss
 High palate
 Mitral regurgitation
 Mitral valve prolapse
 Short stature, nearing dwarfism
 Short palms
 Carpal bone synostosis

Less common symptoms include:

 Failure for permanent teeth to erupt
 Teeth misalignment
 Horseshoe kidney
 Dentition anomalies
 Ocular anomalies
 Nostril anteversion
 Epiphysis in the shape of a cone
 Congenital hearing loss
 Decresed testes size (males)
 Skeletal maturation delay
 Feeding difficulties
 Freckles
 Apple cheeks
 Gastroesophageal reflux
 Hypertelorism
 Joint hypermobility
 Long philtrum
 Rotated ears
 Pseudoepiphyses
 High frequency of middle ear infections
 Rib synostosis
 Scoliosis
 Small foot
 Strabismus
 Tarsal synostosis
 Telecanthus
 Upslanted palpebral fissures
 Broad nasal bridge
 Vesicoureteral reflux

Causes 

It is caused by autosomal dominant mutations of the MAP3K7 gene in the long arm of chromosome 6.

Epidemiology 

Only 12 cases worldwide have been described in medical literature.

References 

Genetic diseases and disorders